The Koser KB-3 Jadran was a Slovenian amphibious sailplane designed and produced by LIBIS aircraft during Yugoslavian period. It was designed by Jaroslav Košer, a student at the Ljubljana Technical Faculty (Tehniška fakulteta v Ljubljani) of the University of Ljubljana and was a development of his earlier Koser-Hrovat KB-1 Triglav design.

Design and development

Specifications

References

High-wing aircraft
Glider aircraft
Flying boats
Amphibious aircraft
Slovenian sport aircraft
Slovenian sailplanes
LIBIS aircraft